Benjamin Roger Massing (20 June 1962 – 9 December 2017) was a Cameroonian footballer who played as a central defender. He played professionally for Diamant Yaoundé, Créteil in France, and Olympic Mvolyé. At international level, he played for the Cameroon national team which he represented at the 1990 FIFA World Cup.

Football career

Diamant Yaoundé
Massing started his professional career with Diamant Yaoundé, a Cameroonian football club based in the country's capital, and finished the 1986–1987 football season with the team.

US Créteil
In the 1987–88 season, Massing signed for French club US Créteil from where he was picked up for Cameroon's squad for the 1990 FIFA World Cup. Massing was sent off in the opening game for a foul on Argentina's Claudio Caniggia, in a 1–0 shock win for Cameroon.

Massing also appeared in the quarter-final loss to England (2–3) where he was booked, conceding a penalty for committing a foul on Gary Lineker.

Massing earned 21 international caps and also took part in three Africa Cup of Nations, including the 1992 edition while playing for Olympic Mvolyé between 1992 and 1993.

Death
On 9 December 2017, Massing died in Edéa, Cameroon at the age of 55.

His half-brother, Georges Mouyémé, is also a retired footballer who played for French clubs Troyes and Angers, and represented Cameroon at the 1994 FIFA World Cup, and the 1996 African Cup of Nations.

References

External links

Cameroon stats at 11V11

1962 births
2017 deaths
People from Littoral Region (Cameroon)
Cameroonian footballers
Association football defenders
Diamant Yaoundé players
Olympic Mvolyé players
Ligue 2 players
US Créteil-Lusitanos players
Cameroon international footballers
1990 FIFA World Cup players
1988 African Cup of Nations players
1990 African Cup of Nations players
1992 African Cup of Nations players
Africa Cup of Nations-winning players
Cameroonian expatriate footballers
Expatriate footballers in France
Cameroonian expatriate sportspeople in France